This article contains information about the literary events and publications of 1832.

Events
February 4 – Chambers's Edinburgh Journal is established by William Chambers.
March 31 – Tait's Edinburgh Magazine is established by William Tait.
May 21 – Washington Irving returns to the United States after living in Europe for seventeen years.
September 21 – Scottish historical novelist and poet Sir Walter Scott dies aged 61 at his home, Abbotsford House, leaving his novel The Siege of Malta unfinished; he is buried in the grounds of Dryburgh Abbey with Presbyterian and Episcopalian ministers in attendance. His novels Count Robert of Paris and Castle Dangerous are published this year. On the same day, English poet and novelist Anna Maria Porter dies of typhus in Bristol aged 53.
December (or January 1833) – Richard Bentley (publisher), having purchased the remaining copyrights to all of Jane Austen's novels from her sister Cassandra, begins to return them to print (for the first time since 1820) in five illustrated volumes as part of his Standard Novels series.
Uncertain dates
William Ticknor co-founds the publishing house that will become Ticknor and Fields, a predecessor of Houghton Mifflin, in Boston, Massachusetts.
James Atkinson makes the first translation from Persian into English of Ferdowsi's Shahnameh, The Sha Nameh of the Persian Poet Firdausi, translated and abridged in prose and verse with notes and illustrations; printed for the Oriental Translation Fund of Great Britain and Ireland; sold by John Murray.
The first Baedeker guidebook, Voyage du Rhin de Mayence à Cologne, by Karl Baedeker in Koblenz (his adaptation of J. A. Klein's Rheinreise von Mainz bis Cöln of 1828) is published without a date.
Ramón de Mesonero Romanos (as 'El Curioso Parlante') begins writing his series of Escenas matritenses (Madrid scenes), originally in Cartas españolas.
Johann Wolfgang von Goethe's Faust: The Second Part of the Tragedy is published.
Théâtre des Folies-Dramatiques opened on the site of the Théâtre de l'Ambigu-Comique on the Boulevard du Temple in Paris under Frédérick Lemaître.
The early 13th century Færeyinga saga, written in Iceland, is first published. 
Publishers begin the use of a paper jacket to wrap book covers.
Polish scholar Konstanty Swidzinski discovers a 15th-century Bible page called the Karta medycka in the Polish village of Medyka

New books

Fiction
Carl Jonas Love Almqvist (anonymous) – Jaktslottet (first in the Törnrosens bok (Book of the Briar Rose) series)
Honoré de Balzac
La Bourse
Le Curé de Tours
Le Colonel Chabert
Louis Lambert
Edward Bulwer-Lytton – Eugene Aram
Selina Davenport – The Unchanged
Alfred de Vigny – Stello
Benjamin Disraeli – Contarini Fleming
Catherine Gore
The Fair of Mayfair
The Opera
Robert Huish – Fitzallan
Washington Irving – Tales of the Alhambra
Letitia Elizabeth Landon - Heath's Book of Beauty, 1833
Frederick Marryat – Newton Forster
 Lord Normanby – The Contrast
Alexander Pushkin – Dubrovsky
Charles Augustin Sainte-Beuve – Volupte
Rosalia St. Clair – The Doomed One
George Sand
Indiana
Valentine
Sir Walter Scott
Castle Dangerous
Count Robert of Paris
Charlotte Elizabeth Tonna – Combination

Children
Frederick Marryat – Newton Forster
Catherine Sinclair – Charlie Seymour, or, The Good Aunt and the Bad Aunt

Drama
 John Baldwin Buckstone – Henriette the Forsaken
Casimir Delavigne – Louis XI
Alfred de Vigny – Stello
Aleksander Fredro – Pan Jowialski (Mr. Jovial)
Victor Hugo – Le Roi s'amuse
Douglas William Jerrold
The Bride of Ludgate
The Factory Girl
The Rent Day
Fanny Kemble – Francis the First
James Sheridan Knowles – The Hunchback
Li Qianfu (李潛夫), translated by Stanislas Julien – Le Cercle de craie (Circle of Chalk; ; 14th century)
Thomas Serle 
 The House of Colberg
 The Merchant of London

Poetry
Leigh Hunt – Poetical Works
Adam Mickiewicz – Dziady (Forefathers' Eve, poetic drama, part III)
Aleksandr Pushkin – Eugene Onegin («Евге́ний Оне́гин», serial publication completed)

Non-fiction
John Austin -The Province of Jurisprudence Determined
Carl von Clausewitz (posthumously) – Vom Krieg (On War)
William Sawrey Gilpin – Practical Hints upon Landscape Gardening: with some remarks on Domestic Architecture, as connected with scenery
Anna Brownell Jameson – Characteristics of Women
Lord Mahon – History of the War of Succession in Spain
Frances Trollope – Domestic Manners of the Americans

Births
January 13 – Horatio Alger, Jr., American writer (died 1899)
January 27 – Lewis Carroll (Charles L. Dodgson), English children's writer and scholar (died 1898)
March 10 – Mary Bigelow Ingham, American author and educator (died 1923)
April 14 – Wilhelm Busch, German humorist and poet (died 1908)
May 17 – Grace Webster Haddock Hinsdale, American author (died 1902)
June 10 – Edwin Arnold, English poet (died 1905)
June 11 – Jules Vallès, French writer (died 1885)
June 23 – Gustav Jaeger, German naturalist (died 1917)
June 30 – Emily Lucas Blackall, American author and philanthropist (died 1892)
July 27 – Hesba Stretton, English children's author (died 1911)
August 3 – Edward Wilmot Blyden, Liberian pan-Africanist (died 1912)
September 30 – Charlotte Riddell, née Cowan, Anglo-Irish novelist and editor (died 1906)
October 9 – Elizabeth Akers Allen, American poet and journalist (died 1911)
October 12 – Theodore Watts-Dunton, English critic and poet (died 1914)
November 28 – Leslie Stephen, English writer (died 1904)
November 29 – Louisa May Alcott, American novelist (died 1888)
December 8 – Bjørnstjerne Bjørnson, Norwegian novelist and Nobel laureate (died 1910)

Deaths
February 3 – George Crabbe, English poet (born 1754)
March 22 – Johann Wolfgang von Goethe, German novelist, dramatist and poet (born 1749)
April 26 – Maria Elizabeth Budden, English novelist and writer of didactic children's books (born c. 1780)
June 6 – Jeremy Bentham, English philosopher and social reformer (born 1748)
July 17 – John Carr, English travel writer and lawyer (born 1772)
September 12 – Priscilla Wakefield, English Quaker writer and philanthropist (born 1751)
September 21
Anna Maria Porter, English poet and novelist (sister of Jane Porter) (born 1780)
Sir Walter Scott, Scottish historical novelist and poet (born 1771)
November 14 – Rasmus Christian Rask, Danish philologist (born 1787)
December 18 – Philip Freneau, American poet and polemicist (born 1752)

References

 
Years of the 19th century in literature